Tachys assamicus is an insect-eating ground beetle of the genus Tachys. It is found in India.

References 

Trechinae
Beetles described in 1964